AMDA (9-Aminomethyl-9,10-dihydroanthracene) is an organic compound which acts as a potent and selective antagonist for the 5-HT2A receptor. It has been used to help study the shape of the 5-HT2A protein, and develop a large family of related derivatives with even higher potency and selectivity.

References 

5-HT2A antagonists
Phenethylamines
Anthracenes